Pygomeles braconnieri, also known commonly as Braconnier's short skink, is a species of lizard in the family Scincidae. The species is endemic to Madagascar.

Etymology
The specific name, braconnieri is in honor of French naturalist Séraphin Braconnier (1812–1884).

Geographic range
P. bracconieri is found in southwestern Madagascar.

Habitat

Description
P. braconnieri has no front legs, and the back legs are very small and styliform. It has no visible ear openings.

References

Further reading
Glaw F, Vences M (2006). A Field Guide to the Amphibians and Reptiles of Madagascar, Third Edition. Cologne, Germany: Vences & Glaw Verlag. 496 pp. .
Grandidier A (1867). "Liste des reptiles nouveau découverts, en 1866, sur la côte sud-ouest de Madagascar ". Revue et Magasin de Zoologie Pure et Appliquée et de Sériciculture Comparée, Paris, 2e Série 19: 232–234. (Pygomeles braconnieri, new species, p. 234). (in French and Latin).
Miralles A, Hipsley CA, Erens J, Gehara M, Rakotoarison A, Glaw F, Müller J, Vences M (2015). "Distinct Patterns of Desynchronized Limb Regression in Malagasy Scincine Lizards (Squamata, Scincidae)". PLoS ONE 10 (6): e0126074.

braconnieri
Reptiles of Madagascar
Reptiles described in 1867
Taxa named by Alfred Grandidier